Nyctonympha is a genus of longhorn beetles of the subfamily Lamiinae, containing the following species:

 Nyctonympha affinis Martins & Galileo, 2008
 Nyctonympha andersoni Martins & Galileo, 1992
 Nyctonympha annulata Aurivillius, 1900
 Nyctonympha annulipes (Belon, 1897)
 Nyctonympha boyacana Galileo & Martins, 2008
 Nyctonympha carcharias (Lameere, 1893)
 Nyctonympha carioca Galileo & Martins, 2001
 Nyctonympha costipennis (Lameere, 1893)
 Nyctonympha cribrata Thomson, 1868
 Nyctonympha flavipes Aurivillius, 1920
 Nyctonympha genieri Martins & Galileo, 1992
 Nyctonympha howdenarum Martins & Galileo, 1992
 Nyctonympha punctata Martins & Galileo, 1989
 Nyctonympha taeniata Martins & Galileo, 1992

References

Forsteriini